Patrick Weissinger (born 2 April 1973) is a German male water polo player and coach. He was a member of the Germany men's national water polo team, playing as a centre back. He was a part of the  team at the 2004 Summer Olympics as the team captain. On club level he played for Wasserfreunde Spandau 04 in Germany.

After his career he became a water polo coach, and was the coach of the German national team at the 2016 Men's European Water Polo Championship squads.

References

1973 births
Living people
German male water polo players
Water polo players at the 2004 Summer Olympics
Olympic water polo players of Germany
Sportspeople from Stuttgart
Water polo coaches
German sports coaches